Baron Ponsonby may refer to:

Baron Ponsonby (of Imokilly), created in 1806 and became extinct in 1866
Frederick Ponsonby, Baron Ponsonby of Roehampton (born 1958)
Baron Ponsonby of Shulbrede, created in 1930
Baron Ponsonby of Sysonby, created in 1749 as a subsidiary title for the Earl of Bessborough